Troxler is a surname. Notable people with the surname include:

Ignaz Paul Vital Troxler (1780–1866), Swiss philosopher
Steve Troxler (born 1952), American farmer and politician
Niklaus Troxler, Swiss graphic designer
William 'Beta Ray Billy' Troxler, Dirt Cop who had a short-lived modeling career

See also
Troxler's fading, a phenomenon of visual perception